Richard Olav Jensen (born 17 March 1996) is a Finnish professional footballer who plays as a centre-back for Ekstraklasa club Górnik Zabrze and the Finland national team. He has captained the Finland national under-21 football team. Jensen was born in Porvoo, Finland.

Jensen made his international debut for Finland in June 2022, at the age of 26.

Club career

Twente

Jensen joined FC Twente's youth academy in 2012 from HJK Helsinki. On 20 January 2017, he signed his first professional contract with Twente for three years. Exactly a year later, on 20 January 2018, he made his professional debut for Twente in a 1–1 Eredivisie tie with Roda JC Kerkrade.

Roda

On 23 July 2018, Jensen joined Eerste Divisie club Roda, signing a two-year deal. He made his debut for Roda on 17 August 2018 playing full 90 minutes in a match against Jong Ajax.

Górnik Zabrze
On 20 July 2022, Ekstraklasa side Górnik Zabrze announced the signing of Jensen on a one-year contract.

International career
Jensen was a youth international for Finland at various youth levels. He captained Finland U21 in the 2019 UEFA European Under-21 Championship qualification.

He made his debut for the Finland national team on 7 June 2022 in a UEFA Nations League qualification game in Helsinki Olympic Stadium against Montenegro.

Personal life
Jensen's younger brother, Fredrik Jensen is also a professional footballer at FC Augsburg.

Career statistics

Club

References

External links

 Roda JC Kerkrade official profile
 Richard Jensen – SPL competition record  
  
 
 
 Kicker.de Profile

1996 births
Living people
People from Porvoo
Sportspeople from Uusimaa
Association football central defenders
Finnish footballers
Finland under-21 international footballers
Finland youth international footballers
Finland international footballers
FC Twente players
Roda JC Kerkrade players
Górnik Zabrze players
Eredivisie players
Eerste Divisie players
Tweede Divisie players
Ekstraklasa players
Finnish expatriate footballers
Finnish expatriate sportspeople in the Netherlands
Expatriate footballers in the Netherlands
Finnish expatriate sportspeople in Poland
Expatriate footballers in Poland
Jong FC Twente players